The Tatra 81 was heavy-duty truck model made by Czech manufacturer Tatra between 1940 and 1942. The development was ordered by German government in the aftermath of the German occupation of Czechoslovakia in 1939 and was complete the same year. It was mainly used in Germany by Ordnungspolizei, but few were utilized by Wehrmacht to ferry supplies.
The vehicle had an 8-cylinder diesel engine with 12467 cc rated to  power. It had 4 gears and 1 reverse gear. The truck chassis, based on the Tatra backbone chassis conception, has 5700kg empty weight.

The civilian use Tatra 81H and Tatra 81HB were fitted with wood gas generator and a 14726 cc,  power engine working on wood gas. To avoid drastic reduction of the engine power, the pistons diameter was increased by 10mm.

References

External links
Tatra 81 photo (with trailer)

81
Cars of the Czech Republic
Military trucks of Czechoslovakia